Arbalester is a scrolling shoot 'em up arcade game released by SETA in 1989, licensed to Taito and Romstar. The player controls a fighter jet and shoots enemies in the air and on the ground, collects power-ups, and defeats bosses to advance levels.

Reception 
In Japan, Game Machine listed Arbalester on their July 1, 1989 issue as being the seventh most-successful table arcade unit of the month.

References

External links
Arbalester at Arcade History

1989 video games
Arcade video games
Romstar games
Vertically scrolling shooters